Achievement First is a charter school network in the United States. Achievement First operates schools in Connecticut (beginning with Amistad Academy in New Haven in 1999 along with other schools in New Haven, Bridgeport and Hartford), New York City (beginning in 2005 with schools in Brownsville, Bushwick, Crown Heights and East New York) and Rhode Island.

Achievement First was one of the charter school organizations helping to establish Relay School for Education (formerly CUNY's Teacher U).

Achievement First runs 34 schools that serve approximately 12,500 students.

List of Schools 
Achievement First has 11 schools in Connecticut, 24 schools in New York, and 7in Rhode Island.

Special Education Lawsuit 
In 2015, five special education students at Achievement First Crown Heights (in Brooklyn) sued the school because (as a New York Times article paraphrased the lawsuits) they "did not get mandated services and were punished for behavior that arose from their disabilities."  According to the New York Times, Achievement First responded that “We serve a substantial number of students with both modest and significant special education needs, and our school leaders, teachers and other professionals work tirelessly each day to serve all our students well [....] Most of our students who receive special education services are experiencing real growth, and we have high levels of overall parent satisfaction."  The lawsuit was settled in early 2018.

New Model 
In 2016, Achievement First introduced  "a new school model that they hope can maintain their high expectations and strict rules, while letting students develop independence and a sense of identity."  The model was called Greenfield.  The founding principal of a Greenfield school said that, "“Part of the model is addressing the idea that our students need to be prepared for college, and not just prepared academically."

Other adjustments over time include shortening the school day by an hour.

References

External links
Achievement First website

Charter schools in Connecticut
Charter schools in New York (state)
Charter schools in Rhode Island
Charter management organizations